Passing for 5,000 yards in a single regular season is a rare achievement in the National Football League (NFL). Some consider it a soft benchmark, comparable to the 10-second 100-meter dash or the 4-minute mile. Nine quarterbacks have accomplished the feat, although Dan Marino was the only one to even break 4600 before 2000.  Marino's record remained intact for 24 years, and for over a decade after his 1999 retirement. Peyton Manning holds the record with 5,477 passing yards in 2013; this surpassed Drew Brees, who recorded a then-record 5,476 passing yards in 2011, by one yard. Drew Brees, Tom Brady, and Patrick Mahomes are the only three NFL quarterbacks to have multiple 5,000 yards seasons; Brees accomplished the feat a record five times, while Brady and Mahomes have accomplished it twice. Matthew Stafford is the only 5,000-yard passer with a 500-yard game in the same season. All quarterbacks have needed at least 600 passing attempts to achieve the yardage, with the exception of Marino (564) and Mahomes (580, 2018 season). Only Marino (362), Winston (380), and Mahomes (383, 2018 season) have done so with fewer than 400 pass completions.

In 2011, Tom Brady, Drew Brees, and Matthew Stafford threw for over 5,000 yards. Patrick Mahomes and Ben Roethlisberger both accomplished it in 2018. NFL quarterbacks have passed for 5,000 yards in a season fifteen times. Despite the rarity of a 5,000-yard passing season, only four have resulted in MVP Honors. Patrick Mahomes earned it twice in 2018 and 2022, while Dan Marino and Peyton Manning have earned it once in 1984 and 2013 respectively. Stafford, Roethlisberger, and Jameis Winston are the only quarterbacks to not be selected to the Pro Bowl the same year of their 5,000-yard season. Patrick Mahomes has accomplished this feat most recently, throwing for 5,250 yards in the 2022 season. In the postseason, he became the first 5,000-yard passer to win the Super Bowl. The Tampa Bay Buccaneers are the only franchise to have multiple quarterbacks (Winston and Brady) accomplish 5,000 passing yards.

In 2021, the NFL approved a 17-game schedule, increasing the likelihood of a 5,000 yard passer.

NFL players with 5,000 passing yards in a season

}}

4,000 passing yards in a season
4,000 yards passing in a season was once considered a rare feat but has lost a bit of significance over the years. During the fourteen-game era, only Joe Namath of the New York Jets passed for over 4,000 yards in a season with 4,007 yards passing in the 1967 AFL season. During the 1980s and 1990s, 4,000 yards became the standard for the league leaders in the NFL. Over the last decade, 4,000 yards has become almost commonplace in the NFL for quarterbacks. In the 2016 season alone, thirteen quarterbacks passed for over 4,000 yards, while the 1990 season, for example, had only one 4,000 yard passer and the 1978 season (the first with a sixteen-game schedule) had zero. This may be a result of less emphasis being placed on the running game and rule changes that serve to offer greater protection to quarterbacks and their receivers. Every team except the Chicago Bears has had a 4,000 yard quarterback season, with the Bears and Jets being the only ones to never have had one with a sixteen/seventeen game schedule.  Peyton Manning and Tom Brady have had the most 4,000 yard seasons (fourteen).

References

Quarterbacks with 5,000 passing yards in a season
National Football League lists